The Indian state of Meghalaya is divided into 12 districts.

Districts 

Meghalaya currently has 12 districts:

References

 
Districts
Meghalaya